The Maryland Attorney General election of 2014 was held on November 4, 2014, to elect the Attorney General of Maryland. Incumbent Democratic Attorney General Doug Gansler was eligible to seek a third term in office, but instead ran unsuccessfully for the Democratic nomination for Governor of Maryland.

Primary elections were held on June 24, 2014. The Democrats nominated State Senator Brian Frosh and the Republicans nominated attorney Jeffrey Pritzker.

Democratic primary

Candidates

Declared
 Aisha Braveboy, state delegate
 Jon Cardin, state delegate and nephew of U.S. Senator Ben Cardin
 Brian Frosh, state senator

Withdrew
 William Frick, state delegate (ran for re-election)

Declined
 Doug Gansler, incumbent attorney general (ran for Governor)

Endorsements

Polling

Results

Republican primary

Candidates

Declared
 Jeffrey Pritzker, attorney and candidate for attorney general in 2002

Declined
 Richard Douglas, attorney, former Deputy Assistant Secretary of Defense and candidate for the U.S. Senate in 2012

Results

General election

Candidates
 Brian Frosh (Democratic), state senator
 Jeffrey Pritzker (Republican), attorney and candidate for attorney general in 2002
 Leo Wayne Dymowski (Libertarian), Democratic candidate for the state house in 1982, Republican candidate for Baltimore City Council in 1991 and Libertarian nominee for Maryland's 2nd congressional district in 2012

Polling

Results

See also
 2014 United States elections
 2014 Maryland gubernatorial election
 2014 Maryland Comptroller election

References

Attorney General
Maryland
Maryland Attorney General elections